is a Japanese manga artist known for illustrating the manga Mermaid Melody Pichi Pichi Pitch which was written by Michiko Yokote. Michiyo Kikuta (Mamotte! Lollipop) once worked under Hanamori as an assistant. Hanamori is a fan of Shōnen manga, and works for Nakayoshi. She cited Yoshihiro Togashi's Yu Yu Hakusho as her biggest influence, alongside artwork by Megumi Tachikawa.

On July 1, 2021 it was announced that Pink Hanamori would be producing a sequel to Mermaid Melody Pichi Pichi Pitch, given the title Mermaid Melody Pichi Pichi Pitch Aqua. The series is to be published monthly in Nakayoshi magazine starting from August 3, 2021.

Works

Manga series
Mermaid Melody Pichi Pichi Pitch Aqua (August 2021 - Ongoing)Sapphire: Princess Knight (Sapphire: Ribbon no Kishi) (April 3, 2008 – July 3, 2009)My Fiance is a Monster!? ( フィアンセはモンスター！？ / Fiancé wa Monster!? ) (September 3, 2007 – February 3, 2008)Yume Yume Yu Yu (Yume Yume Yū Yū / ゆめゆめ☆ゆうゆう)(December 3, 2005 – January 3, 2007) 3 tankoban (volumes)Mermaid Melody Pichi Pichi Pitch (August 2002 - March 2005)

Manga one-shotsMiss Dieter Heroine (Debut work winning Nakayoshi's New Faces contest)Get Nude! (Story after debut work)Moonlight Goddess Diana (Story after debut, with color pages)Cherry ♥ Blossom'' (Story after debut, with color pages and published in the main Nakayoshi magazine)

Reference sites and more information 

Pink Hanamori's Official Site, LIPS  (Now Closed)
Pink Hanamori's Official Blog, Blog  (Now Closed)
 (Now Closed)
Pink Hanamori at Nakayoshi Online  
Pink Hanamori's Manga at Nakayoshi Online  

1977 births
Living people
Manga artists from Shizuoka Prefecture